Carpophilus dimidiatus, the cornsap beetle, is a species of sap-feeding beetle in the family Nitidulidae. It is found in Oceania, Europe, and North America.

References

Further reading

External links

 

Nitidulidae
Articles created by Qbugbot
Beetles described in 1792